"Original" is a song performed by Sia for the original motion picture soundtrack of the 2020 film Dolittle. The song was released for digital download and streaming on January 10, 2020. A lyric video was made available on YouTube on 17 January 2020. "Original" marks Sia's first solo release since "Out There", her collaboration with Hans Zimmer for Seven Worlds, One Planet.

Composition and reception
"Original" was written by Sia, Sean Douglas and frequent collaborator Jesse Shatkin, who also produced the song.

According to Wren Graves of Consequence of Sound, the song begins with "Sia singing the word, 'Boom,' the sound of an epiphany. The song is about a metaphorical wakening, the moment a person decides to be totally and wholly themselves". Vultures Charu Sinha said "Original" is "the type of upbeat, anthemic pop that Sia does best".

Credits and personnel 
Credits adapted from Tidal.

 Sia Furler – songwriter, vocals
 Sean Douglas – songwriter
 Jesse Shatkin – producer, songwriter
 Chris Gehringer – studio personnel

Charts

References

External links
 

2020 singles
2020 songs
Sia (musician) songs
Songs written by Jesse Shatkin
Songs written by Sia (musician)
Songs written for films
Songs written by Sean Douglas (songwriter)